

The Nord 1750 Norelfe was a 1950s French three-seat helicopter built by Nord Aviation and designed by Jean Cantinieau.

Development
The 1750 Norelfe was based on the Matra-Cantinieau MC-101A, an earlier helicopter designed by Jean Cantinieau. It had a single main rotor, with torque control through a movable duct at the end of the tailboom. Powered by a Turbomeca Artouste turboshaft, the first of two Norelfes flew on 28 December 1954.

The company sold the two helicopters and the design rights to Aerotécnica of Spain who redesignated them the Aerotécnica AC-13A. Aerotécnica went on to produce a larger five-seat version, the Aerotécnica AC-14 which was used by the Ejército del Aire (Spanish Air Force).

Specifications (AC-13A)

See also

References

Further reading

 

1950s French helicopters
1950s French experimental aircraft
Norelfe
Single-turbine helicopters
Aircraft first flown in 1954